Brochart is a surname. Notable people with the surname include:

 Constant-Joseph Brochart (1816–1889), French artist
 Paul Brochart (1899–1971), Belgian sprinter